Rubber is a 2010 English-language French independent horror-comedy film about a tire that comes to life and kills people with psychokinetic powers. It was directed and written by Quentin Dupieux. The film was produced by Realitism Films. It was shown at the Cannes Film Festival in 2010, where it received positive reviews from critics.

Plot
A group of people in a California desert are gathered to watch a "film". A sheriff named Chad points out that many moments in cinema happen for "no reason", that life is full of this "no reason", and that this film is an homage to "no reason". Chad is sometimes participating in the narrative action and sometimes commenting on it. An accountant then passes binoculars to the audience members and rides off on a bicycle. The audience starts looking through their binoculars into the distance, waiting for the "film" to start. Throughout the film, this group of people return in order to gauge their reactions to what has taken place so far.

Somewhere in the desert, a tire named Robert suddenly comes to life. After standing upright, he discovers he has psychokinesis and tests his newfound powers by making animals and inanimate objects explode. Robert spots a woman drive by and attempts to use his powers on her, but he only succeeds in making her car stall before he is run over by a truck. The woman manages to start her car and drive off while Robert kills the truck driver that ran him over.

Robert locates the woman at a nearby motel and enters the room next to hers. He kills the motel's maid after she throws him out of the room. Sheriff Chad arrives at the scene to investigate the string of murders. Meanwhile, the in-film audience, having starved for two days, are given a turkey by the accountant, but they begin to suffer intense abdominal pain. While questioning the motel owner, Chad suddenly stops upon hearing an alarm go off, indicating that the audience have started to succumb to the poison-laced turkey. He urges the other characters to go home, telling them the film is over as the audience is dead, but the accountant informs him that an audience member who uses a wheelchair had not eaten turkey. As an embarrassed Chad resumes his investigation, he witnesses Robert kill the motel owner and leads the cops on a "tire hunt". The accountant attempts to poison the wheelchair-using audience member, but he becomes hungry and eats the poisoned food and dies.

Robert comes across a group of people burning a large pile of tires, resulting in him going on a killing spree for three days. Chad lures the tire into a trap using dynamite on a mannequin dressed as the woman. Robert blows up the mannequin's head, but the dynamite fails to detonate. The man who uses a wheelchair mocks the sheriff for the botched trap, enraging Chad enough to destroy Robert with a shotgun off-screen and tossing the tire's carcass at the man, who continues to criticize him for the anticlimax. Robert is reincarnated as a tricycle and kills the man in the wheelchair before recruiting an army of tires on his way to Hollywood.

During the credits, the opening scene plays again, but this time from different angles, revealing that Chad is not speaking to anyone.

Cast

 Stephen Spinella as Lieutenant Chad
 Jack Plotnick as Accountant
 Roxane Mesquida as Sheila
 Wings Hauser as Man in Wheelchair
 Ethan Cohn as Movie Buff Ethan
 Charley Koontz as Movie Buff Charley
 Hayley Holmes as Cindy
 Haley Ramm as Fiona
 Daniel Quinn as Dad
 Devin Brochu as Son
 Tara Jean O'Brien as Martina the Cleaning Lady
 David Bowe as Mr. Hugues
 Blake Robbins as Eric
 Remy Thorne as Zach
 Cecelia Antoinette as Woman
 Thomas F. Duffy as Deputy Xavier
 Winston Chow as Deputy Luke
 Pete Dicecco as Deputy Pete
 Courtenay Taylor as Deputy Denise
 James Parks as Deputy Doug
 Gaspard Augé as Hitchhiker
 Pedro Winter  as Tyre Burner
 Robert the Tire as Robert

Production
The effects of the tire moving were done via practical effects such as remote controls. Director Quentin Dupieux has noted that due to the inherent "emptiness" of a tire that making a remote-controlled tire was difficult as "you can’t really hide the mechanisms well". CGI effects were used for the shots of heads exploding; during filming Dupieux used practical effects, but he was unhappy with the results.

During the writing process, the tire, Robert, was designed solely as a bad guy with no redeeming qualities. While shooting, however, Dupieux determined that this was the wrong approach realizing "there’s nothing evil about a tire" based partly on early camera tests. Robert was reworked to be "more like a stupid dog". The 2008 animated film WALL-E, specifically the first act, was also an influence on the character.

The film begins with Lieutenant Chad making a speech about how events in movies often happen for "no reason". Dupieux has stated he was inclined to put that speech in because he was not interested in explaining how the tire came to life, although he knew such a setup would be expected. The meta element of the film came organically, as Dupieux quickly grew tired of writing about a killer tire. He was partly influenced by an experience where he snuck into a theater playing his previous film Steak only to find that no one else was in the theater, which he noted was "kind of scary."

Release
The film was shown on May 15, 2010, at Cannes Critic's Week.
After the film was shown at Cannes, it was picked up for US distribution by Magnet Releasing. Rubber had its outside-France premiere on July 9, 2010, at the Fantasia Festival.

Rubber was shown at the Sitges Film Festival where it had a positive reception. The film was shown in Toronto at the After Dark Film Festival. Fangoria magazine stated the film "deeply split" the audience reaction saying that Rubber earned "huge laughs and applause as well as the only boos heard by Fango at the fest."

The DVD and soundtrack were made available to purchase from March 14, 2011, and the DVD and Blu-ray Disc from June 7, 2011.

Reception
The film received generally mixed-to-positive reviews from critics. Rotten Tomatoes gives it a 69% rating based on 87 reviews, with an average score of 6.10/10. The site's consensus reads: "A clever premise gets plenty of comic blood and violence but it's hampered by some questionable storytelling techniques from director Quentin Dupieux." IndieWire called the film "one of the more bizarre experiments with genre in quite some time" and that it "does begin to wear out its welcome around the sixty-minute mark, but you can't blame Dupieux for giving it a shot."

Outside Cannes, the film received positive reception at other film festivals. Twitch Film gave the film a positive review saying it was "impeccably shot, scored and designed", and "the film is intellectual wankery of the highest order in the sheepskin of a B-film of the lowest order". The Huffington Post wrote that Quentin Dupieux "succeeds in creating an entertaining, sometimes even tense horror film with the very same footage he lightly mocks. The result is an uber-cerebral spoof that is at once silly and smart, populist like a mildly trashy B-movie yet high brow like absurdist theater."

The Telegraph wrote a negative review of the film, saying "How could it not be brilliant? By, at 85 minutes, being an hour too long. By being arch rather than schlocky. And by wasting too much time on dull dialogue celebrating its 'No Reason' philosophy." Variety also gave a negative review, saying that Rubber is "Neither scary, funny, nor anywhere near as clever as it seems to think it is, pic offers auds few reasons to want to see it beyond its one-joke premise." Will Leitch from The Projector concluded his review by stating that "Rubber" is "a movie about how watching movies is stupid," giving the film a grade D.

Gregory Bernard said of the film: "We’re really blessed to have so much attention on such a small film. We both took risks – [Quentin] artistically, me in production – and the fact that we had, in general, a very positive response from the public; we’ve had audiences who really loved it."

Soundtrack

The official soundtrack for the film Rubber, by Gaspard Augé and Quentin Dupieux (the latter under his stage name "Mr. Oizo"), was released on November 8, 2010 on Ed Banger Records.

Track listing

References

External links
 
 
 
 
 

2010 films
2010 comedy horror films
Films directed by Quentin Dupieux
Films set in California
Films shot in California
Films shot in Los Angeles
Films set in deserts
French horror films
French independent films
Self-reflexive films
Tires
English-language French films
2010 independent films
French comedy horror films
2010s English-language films
2010s French films